The triple-alpha process is a set of nuclear fusion reactions by which three helium-4 nuclei (alpha particles) are transformed into carbon.

Triple-alpha process in stars

Helium accumulates in the cores of stars as a result of the proton–proton chain reaction and the carbon–nitrogen–oxygen cycle.

When a star runs out of hydrogen to fuse in its core, it begins to contract and heat up. If the central temperature rises to 108 K, six times hotter than the Sun's core, alpha particles can fuse fast enough to get past the beryllium-8 barrier and produce significant amounts of stable carbon-12.

{|
|  +  → 
|  (−0.0918 MeV)
|-
|  +  →  + 2
|  (+7.367 MeV)
|}

The net energy release of the process is 7.275 MeV.

As a side effect of the process, some carbon nuclei fuse with additional helium to produce a stable isotope of oxygen and energy:

  +  →  +  (+7.162 MeV)

Fusing with additional helium nuclei can create heavier elements in a chain of stellar nucleosynthesis known as the alpha process, but these reactions are only significant at higher temperatures and pressures than in cores undergoing the triple-alpha process.  This creates a situation in which stellar nucleosynthesis produces large amounts of carbon and oxygen but only a small fraction of those elements are converted into neon and heavier elements. Oxygen and carbon are the main "ash" of helium-4 burning.

Primordial carbon

The triple-alpha process is ineffective at the pressures and temperatures early in the Big Bang. One consequence of this is that no significant amount of carbon was produced in the Big Bang.

Resonances
Ordinarily, the probability of the triple-alpha process is extremely small. However, the beryllium-8 ground state has almost exactly the energy of two alpha particles. In the second step, 8Be + 4He has almost exactly the energy of an excited state of 12C. This resonance greatly increases the probability that an incoming alpha particle will combine with beryllium-8 to form carbon.  The existence of this resonance was predicted by Fred Hoyle before its actual observation, based on the physical necessity for it to exist, in order for carbon to be formed in stars. The prediction and then discovery of this energy resonance and process gave very significant support to Hoyle's hypothesis of stellar nucleosynthesis, which posited that all chemical elements had originally been formed from hydrogen, the true primordial substance. The anthropic principle has been cited to explain the fact that nuclear resonances are sensitively arranged to create large amounts of carbon and oxygen in the universe.

Nucleosynthesis of heavy elements
With further increases of temperature and density, fusion processes produce nuclides only up to nickel-56 (which decays later to iron); heavier elements (those beyond Ni) are created mainly by neutron capture.  The slow capture of neutrons, the s-process, produces about half of elements beyond iron.  The other half are produced by rapid neutron capture, the r-process, which probably occurs in core-collapse supernovae and neutron star mergers.

Reaction rate and stellar evolution
The triple-alpha steps are strongly dependent on the temperature and density of the stellar material. The power released by the reaction is approximately proportional to the temperature to the 40th power, and the density squared. In contrast, the proton–proton chain reaction produces energy at a rate proportional to the fourth power of temperature, the CNO cycle at about the 17th power of the temperature, and both are linearly proportional to the density. This strong temperature dependence has consequences for the late stage of stellar evolution, the red-giant stage.

For lower mass stars on the red-giant branch, the helium accumulating in the core is prevented from further collapse only by electron degeneracy pressure.  The entire degenerate core is at the same temperature and pressure, so when its density becomes high enough, fusion via the triple-alpha process rate starts throughout the core.  The core is unable to expand in response to the increased energy production until the pressure is high enough to lift the degeneracy.  As a consequence, the temperature increases, causing an increased reaction rate in a positive feedback cycle that becomes a runaway reaction. This process, known as the helium flash, lasts a matter of seconds but burns 60–80% of the helium in the core.  During the core flash, the star's energy production can reach approximately 1011 solar luminosities which is comparable to the luminosity of a whole galaxy, although no effects will be immediately observed at the surface, as the whole energy is used up to lift the core from the degenerate to normal, gaseous state. Since the core is no longer degenerate, hydrostatic equilibrium is once more established and the star begins to "burn" helium at its core and hydrogen in a spherical layer above the core. The star enters a steady helium-burning phase which lasts about 10% of the time it spent on the main sequence (the Sun is expected to burn helium at its core for about a billion years after the helium flash).

For higher mass stars, carbon collects in the core, displacing the helium to a surrounding shell where helium burning occurs. In this helium shell, the pressures are lower and the mass is not supported by electron degeneracy. Thus, as opposed to the center of the star, the shell is able to expand in response to increased thermal pressure in the helium shell. Expansion cools this layer and slows the reaction, causing the star to contract again. This process continues cyclically, and stars undergoing this process will have periodically variable radius and power production. These stars will also lose material from their outer layers as they expand and contract.

Discovery
The triple-alpha process is highly dependent on carbon-12 and beryllium-8 having resonances with slightly more energy than helium-4. Based on known resonances, by 1952 it seemed impossible for ordinary stars to produce carbon as well as any heavier element. Nuclear physicist William Alfred Fowler had noted the beryllium-8 resonance, and Edwin Salpeter had calculated the reaction rate for 8Be, 12C, and 16O nucleosynthesis taking this resonance into account. However, Salpeter calculated that red giants burned helium at temperatures of 2·108 K or higher, whereas other recent work hypothesized temperatures as low as 1.1·108 K for the core of a red giant.

Salpeter's paper mentioned in passing the effects that unknown resonances in carbon-12 would have on his calculations, but the author never followed up on them. It was instead astrophysicist Fred Hoyle who, in 1953, used the abundance of carbon-12 in the universe as evidence for the existence of a carbon-12 resonance. The only way Hoyle could find that would produce an abundance of both carbon and oxygen was through a triple-alpha process with a carbon-12 resonance near 7.68 MeV, which would also eliminate the discrepancy in Salpeter's calculations.

Hoyle went to Fowler's lab at Caltech and said that there had to be a resonance of 7.68 MeV in the carbon-12 nucleus. (There had been reports of an excited state at about 7.5 MeV.) Fred Hoyle's audacity in doing this is remarkable, and initially the nuclear physicists in the lab were skeptical. Finally, a junior physicist, Ward Whaling, fresh from Rice University, who was looking for a project decided to look for the resonance. Fowler gave Whaling permission to use an old Van de Graaff generator that was not being used. Hoyle was back in Cambridge when Fowler's lab discovered a carbon-12 resonance near 7.65 MeV a few months later, validating his prediction. The nuclear physicists put Hoyle as first author on a paper delivered by Whaling at the summer meeting of the American Physical Society. A long and fruitful collaboration between Hoyle and Fowler soon followed, with Fowler even coming to Cambridge.

The final reaction product lies in a 0+ state (spin 0 and positive parity). Since the Hoyle state was predicted to be either a 0+ or a 2+ state, electron–positron pairs or gamma rays were expected to be seen. However, when experiments were carried out, the gamma emission reaction channel was not observed, and this meant the state must be a 0+ state. This state completely suppresses single gamma emission, since single gamma emission must carry away at least 1 unit of angular momentum. Pair production from an excited 0+ state is possible because their combined spins (0) can couple to a reaction that has a change in angular momentum of 0.

Improbability and fine-tuning

Carbon is a necessary component of all known life. 12C, a stable isotope of carbon, is abundantly produced in stars due to three factors:

 The decay lifetime of a 8Be nucleus is four orders of magnitude larger than the time for two 4He nuclei (alpha particles) to scatter.
 An excited state of the 12C nucleus exists a little (0.3193 MeV) above the energy level of 8Be + 4He. This is necessary because the ground state of 12C is 7.3367 MeV below the energy of 8Be + 4He; a 8Be nucleus and a 4He nucleus cannot reasonably fuse directly into a ground-state 12C nucleus. However, 8Be and 4He use the kinetic energy of their collision to fuse into the excited 12C (kinetic energy supplies the additional 0.3193 MeV necessary to reach the excited state), which can then transition to its stable ground state. According to one calculation, the energy level of this excited state must be between about 7.3 MeV and 7.9 MeV to produce sufficient carbon for life to exist, and must be further "fine-tuned" to between 7.596 MeV and 7.716 MeV in order to produce the abundant level of 12C observed in nature. The Hoyle state has been measured to be about 7.65 MeV above the ground state of 12C.
 In the reaction 12C + 4He →  16O, there is an excited state of oxygen which, if it were slightly higher, would provide a resonance and speed up the reaction. In that case, insufficient carbon would exist in nature; almost all of it would have converted to oxygen.

Some scholars argue the 7.656 MeV Hoyle resonance, in particular, is unlikely to be the product of mere chance. Fred Hoyle argued in 1982 that the Hoyle resonance was evidence of a "superintellect"; Leonard Susskind in The Cosmic Landscape rejects Hoyle's intelligent design argument. Instead, some scientists believe that different universes, portions of a vast "multiverse", have different fundamental constants: according to this controversial fine-tuning hypothesis, life can only evolve in the minority of universes where the fundamental constants happen to be fine-tuned to support the existence of life. Other scientists reject the hypothesis of the multiverse on account of the lack of independent evidence.

References

Nucleosynthesis